The Jewish Socialists' Group (JSG) is a Jewish socialist collective in Britain, formed in the 1970s.

History

JSG was founded in Manchester/Liverpool in 1974–1977 as a lobby group campaigning against the fascist National Front and for the left to relate more positively to Jewish issues. A London branch formed in 1977. They describe themselves as a political organisation campaigning for Jewish rights and the rights of all oppressed minorities in building a socialist future.

The JSG supported the original Anti-Nazi League and was active in street-level militant anti-fascism. It participated in the  Beyond the Fragments conference which sought to renew democratic socialism.
In the early 1980s, it was active in campaigning for peace in Israel/Palestine.

It developed a perspective via drawing on the tradition of the Bund, stressing Yiddishism, cultural pluralism and a commitment to the vitality of the diaspora.

In the mid-1980s, it became associated with the Greater London Council's municipal socialism and multiculturalism, receiving funding to launch Jewish Cultural and Anti-Racist Project (JCARP). Additionally, it was frequently in conflict with the Jewish communal leadership and in particular, the Association of Jewish Ex-Servicemen and Women (AJEX).

The JSG has been critical of allegations of antisemitism in the Labour Party, stating in April 2016: Accusations of anti-Semitism are currently being weaponised to attack the Jeremy Corbyn-led Labour party with claims that Labour has a 'problem' of anti-Semitism... This is despite Corbyn's longstanding record of actively opposing fascism and all forms of racism, and being a firm a supporter of the rights of refugees and of human rights globally.

Publications

A magazine, Jewish Socialist, was launched in 1985 and continues publication today.

See also
 Jewish Labour Movement
 Jewish Voice for Labour

References

External links
 

Bundism in Europe
Jewish anti-Zionism in the United Kingdom
Jewish political organizations
Political organisations based in London
Socialism in the United Kingdom
Jewish anti-occupation groups
Jewish socialism
Organizations established in the 1970s
Jews and Judaism in the United Kingdom
1970s establishments in the United Kingdom